Barbara Reagan (1920-2002) was an American economist.  From 1967 - 1990, she was a professor at the Southern Methodist University, Dallas, Texas. Her areas of specialization included analysis and methodology of national surveys of income and expenditure, labour migration of African and Mexican Americans, and occupational segregation by sex and factors affecting women’s labour supply.  She was a founding member of the Committee on the Status of Women in the Economics Profession.  After her retirement from Southern Methodist University, she was a director of the American Savings Bank and The Texas Guaranteed Student Loan Corporation.  Her daughter, Patricia Reagan, is also a professor of economics.

Selected publications

 Reagan, B. B. (1975). Two supply curves for economists? Implications of mobility and career attachment of women. The American Economic Review, 65(2), 100-107.

References

External links

1920 births
2002 deaths
20th-century American economists
American women economists
Texas Woman's University faculty
Southern Methodist University faculty
Mary Baldwin University alumni
University of Texas at Austin alumni
American University alumni
Harvard University alumni
20th-century American women